The Lord Chamberlain's Office is a department within the British Royal Household. It is concerned with matters such as protocol, state visits, investitures, garden parties, royal weddings and funerals. For example, in April 2005 it organised the wedding of Charles, Prince of Wales and Camilla Parker Bowles. It is also responsible for authorising use of the Royal Arms.

As the Lord Chamberlain is a part-time position the day-to-day work of the Office is conducted by the Comptroller of the Lord Chamberlain's Office.

List of Comptrollers
 Sir Spencer Ponsonby-Fane GCB ISO (1857–1901)
 Major-General Sir Arthur Ellis, GCVO MC (1901–1907)
 Brigadier-General Sir Douglas Dawson, GCVO KCB CMG (1907–1920)
 Colonel the Honourable Sir George Crichton, GCVO DL (1920–1936)
 Lieutenant-Colonel Sir Terence Nugent, GCVO MC (1936–1960)
 Brigadier Sir Norman Gwatkin, GCVO DSO (1960–1964)
 Lieutenant-Colonel Sir Eric Penn, GCVO OBE MC (1964–1981)
 Lieutenant-Colonel Sir John Johnston, GCVO MC (1981–1987)
 Lieutenant-Colonel George Alston-Roberts-West, CVO DL (1987–1990)
 Lieutenant-Colonel Sir Malcolm Ross, GCVO OBE (1991–2005)
 Lieutenant-Colonel Sir Andrew Ford, GCVO (2006–2018)
 Lieutenant-Colonel Michael Vernon (2019 - Present)

Theatre censorship
The Lord Chamberlain's Office had a more significant role (under the Theatres Act 1843) in British society prior to 1968, as it was the official censor for virtually all theatre performed in Britain. Commercial theatre owners were generally satisfied by the safety this arrangement gave them; so long as they presented only licensed plays they were effectively immune from prosecution for any offence a play might cause. There were campaigns by playwrights, however, in opposition to the Lord Chamberlain's censorship, such as those involving J. M. Barrie in 1909 and 1911. Some plays were not licensed in the 1930s, during the period of appeasement, because they were critical of the German Nazi regime and it was feared that allowing certain plays to be performed might alienate what was still thought of as a friendly government. This included Terence Rattigan's Follow My Leader, which was submitted to the Lord Chamberlain's office in 1938 but was not granted a license due to its farcical depiction of the German government "not being in the best interests of the country". It was not granted a license until 1940 following the end of appeasement. Lord Cromer, then Lord Chamberlain, regularly consulted the Foreign Office and sometimes, the German Embassy. In the latter case, the submissions were intended to be read by a "friendly German".

By the 1960s, there were many playwrights and producers who wished to produce controversial works such as Lady Chatterley's Lover. Theatre companies such as the Royal Court Theatre came into open conflict with the Lord Chamberlain's Office. Sometimes they would resort to such measures as declaring themselves private clubs for the performance of certain plays. Edward Bond's Saved and John Osborne's A Patriot for Me played a large role in the build up to the Theatres Act 1968. The Lord Chamberlain's Office technically had jurisdiction over private performances, but had generally avoided getting involved with bona-fide private clubs until Saved. While they had cause for prosecution, there was a fear that this would call into question theatre censorship as a whole. This is precisely what happened after the Royal Court Theatre was prosecuted. Director William Gaskill was discharged and the company were fined but the publicity surrounding the case called into question the necessity of the Lord Chamberlain's role in theatre. The 1966 Joint Select Committee was set up to discuss possible changes to the Theatres Act following the dissatisfaction with how theatre censorship was being handled. It included eight representatives of the House of Lords, eight commoners, and witnesses of varying theatrical backgrounds, including Peter Hall. The committee met between 1966 and 1967 over the course of sixteen meetings and it eventually resulted in the abolition of the role of official censor in the Theatres Act 1968.

References

Bibliography

External links 
 The British Monarchy – The Lord Chamberlain's Office

British monarchy
Censorship in the arts
Theatre controversies
Censorship in the United Kingdom
Theatre in the United Kingdom
Positions within the British Royal Household